The 1915 Cornell Big Red football team was an American football team that represented Cornell University as an independent during the 1915 college football season. In its fourth season under head coach Albert Sharpe, the Big Red compiled a 9–0 record, shut out four of nine opponents, and outscored all opponents by a total of 287 to 50. The 1915 team was known as The Big Red Machine, defeating every opponent by more than a touchdown. 

Cornell was retroactively named as the national champion by NCAA-designated "major selectors" the Helms Athletic Foundation, Houlgate System, and National Championship Foundation, and as a co-national champion (with Pittsburgh) by Parke H. Davis.

Two Cornell players were consensus first-team selections on the 1915 All-American football team: quarterback Charley Barrett and end Murray Shelton. Both of them were later inducted into the College Football Hall of Fame. Barrett has been called the best quarterback of the 1910s.

Schedule

References

External links
 

Cornell
Cornell Big Red football seasons
College football national champions
College football undefeated seasons
Cornell Big Red football